The Muzzle Loaders Association of Great Britain was formed in 1952 and is the governing body for muzzle loading within the UK. It is recognized by the Muzzle Loaders Associations International Committee. Its objectives are to encourage an interest in muzzle loading firearms; to promote, regulate and safeguard their use; and to preserve their freedom of collection. It produces a quarterly magazine called Black Powder.

Until 2014, the Association occupied the Grade-II "Muzzleloader's Association Hut" at the National Shooting Centre, Bisley.

See also
 Black powder
 Muzzle Loaders Associations International Committee
 List of shooting sports organizations

External links
Muzzle Loaders Association of Great Britain

References

Sports governing bodies in the United Kingdom
Rifle associations
1952 establishments in the United Kingdom
Gun rights advocacy groups